The Philly Pops is an orchestra based in Philadelphia, Pennsylvania.  Founded by presenter and producer, Moe Septee, and conducted for 35 years by two time Grammy Award-winning pianist Peter Nero, the Philly Pops plays orchestral versions of popular jazz, swing, Broadway songs and blues. David Charles Abell took over the positions of principal conductor and music director in 2020. On October 4, 1999, the Philly Pops was designated the official pops orchestra of the Commonwealth of Pennsylvania.

The Philly Pops will cease operations after the 2022-2023 season.

References

External links

American jazz ensembles from  Pennsylvania
Pops orchestras
Musical groups from Philadelphia
Culture of Philadelphia
Orchestras based in Pennsylvania
Jazz musicians from Pennsylvania